Cevizdere is a village of Elazığ District in Elazığ Province in eastern Turkey. Its population is 117 (2021). The village is populated by Kurds and is the village where Dursun Karataş came from. It is on Lake Hazar.

History
The old name of the village is Kürdemlik.

References 

Kurdish settlements in Elazığ Province
Villages in Elazığ District